The Jeanneau Captain is a French trailerable sailboat and powerboat that was first built in 1968.

Production
The design was built by Jeanneau in France, starting in 1968, but it is now out of production.

Design
The Captain was sold as a pure power boat with a wheelhouse added, as a sailboat or as an auxiliary sailboat, with an inboard motor.

The Captain is a recreational keelboat, built predominantly of fiberglass. As a sailboat it has a fractional sloop rig. The hull has a raked stem, a slightly angled transom, a transom-hung rudder controlled by a tiller and a fixed stub keel, with a retractable centerboard. It displaces  and carries  of ballast.

The boat is optionally fitted with a French Renault inboard engine. The fuel tank holds .

See also
List of sailing boat types

References

External links

Photo of a Captain in powerboat configuration
Photo of a Captain in sailboat configuration

Keelboats
Motorboats
1960s sailboat type designs
Sailing yachts
Trailer sailers
Sailboat types built by Jeanneau